Jaman Pass may refer to:
Col de Jaman, a mountain pass in the Swiss Alps
Jaman Pass, a pass on the Afghanistan–Tajikistan border